Joseph Alexandre Napoleon Dorval (May 16, 1878 – June 29, 1955) was the third head coach of the Montreal Canadiens ice hockey team, following Adolphe Lecours.  He coached the team for the 1911–12 season and the 1912–13 season.  His record for those two seasons was 17-21-0.

References

Canadian ice hockey coaches
Montreal Canadiens coaches